Edgar Ceferino Marín Leví  (born 22 May 1943) is a Costa Rican retired footballer.

Club career
Born in Pueblo Nuevo, Puntarenas, Marín made his league debut in 1962 for Deportivo Saprissa against Uruguay de Coronado and played for them until 1967 before moving to the NASL to play for the Oakland Clippers and Kansas City Spurs. He also failed tests for PEC Zwolle and Go Ahead Eagles in the Netherlands.

Marín won 12 Primera División de Costa Rica titles with Deportivo Saprissa during the 1960s and 1970s. He won six consecutive titles from 1972 to 1977.

International career
Marín also represented Costa Rica at the international level, representing his country in 10 FIFA World Cup qualification matches. He won a total of 32 caps, scoring 4 goals.

He retired in 1979.

References

External links
 NASL career stats

1943 births
Living people
People from Puntarenas Province
Association football forwards
Costa Rican footballers
Costa Rica international footballers
Deportivo Saprissa players
Oakland Clippers players
Kansas City Spurs players
National Professional Soccer League (1967) players
North American Soccer League (1968–1984) players
Costa Rican expatriate footballers
Expatriate soccer players in the United States